Paria Point is a  elevation summit located in the Kolob Canyons section of Zion National Park, in Washington County, Utah, United States. Tucupit Point is situated  immediately north, and Beatty Point is  immediately south, with 2,000-foot-deep finger canyons between each. Other neighbors include Nagunt Mesa and Timber Top Mountain to the south, and Horse Ranch Mountain to the north. Paria Point is composed of Jurassic Navajo sandstone overlaying tilted Kayenta Formation. Precipitation runoff  drains into Taylor Creek, which is part of the Virgin River drainage basin. This feature's paria name is a Paiute word meaning "muddy water" or "elk water".

Climate
Spring and fall are the most favorable seasons to visit Paria Point. According to the Köppen climate classification system, it is located in a Cold semi-arid climate zone, which is defined by the coldest month having an average mean temperature below 32 °F (0 °C), and at least 50% of the total annual precipitation being received during the spring and summer.

Gallery

See also

 List of mountains in Utah
 Geology of the Zion and Kolob canyons area
 Colorado Plateau

References

External links

 Zion National Park National Park Service
 Weather forecast: National Weather Service
 Paria Point rock climbing: Mountainproject.com

Mountains of Utah
Zion National Park
Mountains of Washington County, Utah
Rock formations of Utah
Sandstone formations of the United States
Landforms of Washington County, Utah